Marcus Watson (born 27 June 1991) is an English rugby union player who plays at wing and fullback for Benetton in the United Rugby Championship. 

Watson attended St George's College, Weybridge in Surrey, as a full-back.

Club career
Watson started his career at London Irish in 2009, where he came through the club's academy. He only made six first team appearances before moving to Saracens in 2011.

Watson never made a competitive first team appearance for Saracens but did help them win the JP Morgan Premiership Sevens.

Watson transitioned back to 15-a-side when he signed with Newcastle Falcons after three years with England Sevens in February 2015. He was awarded the team's player of the month in November 2017. On 22 February 2017, Watson signed for Premiership rivals Wasps in the English Premiership ahead of the 2017-18 season.

International career
Watson played for England in the World Rugby Under 20 Championship in 2010. Marcus played for England national rugby sevens team from 2012–2015.
He was selected for Team GB's Rugby 7s squad to play at the Rio Olympic Games 2016  in which GB won silver.

References

External links
 
 
 
 
 
 

1991 births
Living people
Newcastle Falcons players
English rugby union players
London Irish players
People educated at St George's College, Weybridge
Rugby union fullbacks
Rugby union wings
Rugby sevens players at the 2016 Summer Olympics
Olympic rugby sevens players of Great Britain
Great Britain national rugby sevens team players
Olympic silver medallists for Great Britain
Olympic medalists in rugby sevens
Medalists at the 2016 Summer Olympics
England international rugby sevens players
Rugby union players from Hillingdon
Saracens F.C. players
English sportspeople of South African descent
Male rugby sevens players
Rugby sevens players at the 2014 Commonwealth Games
Commonwealth Games rugby sevens players of England
Wasps RFC players
Benetton Rugby players